Al Mahbes is a town in the UN-monitored buffer zone of Western Sahara, near the Algerian border, some  northeast of Bir Lehlou.

Mahbes' partner municipalities are the Spanish city of Noia and the Italian municipalities of Sesto Fiorentino and San Giovanni Valdarno.

References

Populated places in Western Sahara